Christine Lake is a  water body located in Coos County in northern New Hampshire, United States, in the town of Stark. The lake lies southeast of the Percy Peaks and north of the Upper Ammonoosuc River. Water from Christine Lake flows via the Upper Ammonoosuc to the Connecticut River at Groveton and thence south to Long Island Sound.

The lake is classified as a coldwater fishery, with observed species including brook trout, brown trout, and smallmouth bass.

See also

List of lakes in New Hampshire

References

Lakes of Coös County, New Hampshire